Northern Lights is the self-titled debut album by the progressive bluegrass band Northern Lights, recorded in 1976 under the Revonah Records label.

Track listing

Personnel
 Taylor Armerding - mandolin, vocals
 Bob Emery - guitar, vocals
 Dan Marcus - banjo, vocals
 Marty Sachs - bass, vocals

References

External links
Official site

1976 debut albums
Northern Lights (bluegrass band) albums